Jalan Ulu Yam (Selangor state route B57) is a major road in Klang Valley region, Selangor, Malaysia.

Route background
The Kilometre Zero of Jalan Ulu Yam starts at Ulu Yam.

It provides a panoramic view of Batu Dam lake, Sungai Tua Waterfall and Ulu Yam.

At most sections, the Selangor State Route B57 was built under the JKR R5 road standard, allowing maximum speed limit of up to 90 km/h.

There are no alternate routes or sections with motorcycle lanes.

Accidents 
A number of car accidents have occurred on Jalan Ulu Yam in recent years. The road is considered somewhat dangerous as a result of overzealous drivers flocking to the area because of its popularity as a weekend spot.

List of junctions

References 

Roads in Selangor